Chen Uen (27 December 1958 – 26 March 2017) was a Taiwanese manhua artist.  Some of his works include Magical Super Asia,  Banzai and The First King.  He also worked as an illustrator for Koei's Romance of the Three Kingdoms PS2 game series.

He began drawing in the late 1970s, and specialized in manga starting in 1984. Soon after, Chen saw an increase in popularity as media restrictions were relaxed following the Kaohsiung Incident.

In 1991, Chen was the first foreigner to win an award at the Japanese Cartoonists Association for his work, Heroes of the East Chou Dynasty.

Born Cheng Chin-wen in 1958, he died in 2017 of a heart attack, aged 58.

A documentary Inside the Arts: The Profound Aesthetics -- Chen Uen was produced by Public Television Service and won a bronze medal at the 2019 New York Festivals TV & Film Awards.

References

External links
 Chen Uen profile on Comicart 
 Chen Uen in Ultimate Manga Guide

1958 births
2017 deaths
Taiwanese comics artists
Artists from Taoyuan City